The Mensirip Island is an island in Mersing District, Johor, Malaysia.

See also
 List of islands of Malaysia

Islands of Johor
Mersing District